Ted Newman may refer to:

 Ezra T. Newman (1929–2021), American physicist
 Ted Newman (singer) (born 1939), American singer and musician

See also
 Edward Newman (disambiguation)
 Theodore R. Newman Jr. (born 1934), chief judge of the District of Columbia Court of Appeals